Gomont is a French commune in Ardennes

Gomont may also refer to:

 Maurice Gomont (1839-1909), a French phycologist who used the author abbreviation Gomont
 Marly-Gomont, a French commune in Aisne and Hauts-de-France
 "Marly-Gomont" (song), a single by French rapper Kamini about the commune

See also

 Gomontia
 Gomontiaceae
 Gomon
 Gormond et Isembart
 Goumont (disambiguation)